Aquele Luxo! (Portuguese for "That Luxury!") is a promotional extended play by Brazilian alternative rock band Charlie Brown Jr. Released in 1999 by Virgin Records in a very limited run, it served as a teaser for the band's then-upcoming second studio album, Preço Curto... Prazo Longo.

The photograph used as the EP's cover art was taken in front of a historical house in the city of Brusque, Santa Catarina, which belonged to the family of Aloísio Buss, who would become a long-time friend of vocalist Chorão.

Track listing

Personnel
 Charlie Brown Jr.
 Chorão – vocals
 Champignon – bass guitar, backing vocals, beatboxing
 Thiago Castanho – electric guitar, backing vocals
 Marcão – electric guitar
 Renato Pelado – drums

 Additional musicians
 De Menos Crime – vocals in "União"
 Radjja de Santos – vocals in "União"
 Consciência Humana – vocals in "União"
 Homens Crânio – vocals in "União"
 DJ Deco Murphy – scratches in "Confisco"

References

1999 EPs
Promotional albums
Virgin Records EPs
Albums produced by Rick Bonadio
Charlie Brown Jr. albums